was a Japanese businessman in the period leading up to World War II.

Early career
In 1922 he co-translated from German into Japanese the corporate management book Die Unternehmungsformen: mit Einschluß der Genossenschaften und der Sozialisierun by Robert Liefmann.

Arrest in London
Their only child, a son Minoru Makihara was born there in 1930. After some time elsewhere they returned to London in 1937.

On Friday 2 August 1940, Makihara and several others were arrested on suspicion of espionage, and taken to Brixton prison. Thanks to intervention by the Japanophile (and pro-Japanese spy) Lord Sempill and others, he was released a few days later, on Monday 5 August, due to "insufficient evidence".

Return to Japan and death
Mitsubishi closed their London office in October 1940, whereupon Makihara returned to Tokyo, becoming General Manager of the company's Marine Products Division.

In May 1942 he was ordered by the military to travel to Japan's colonies in southeast Asia to aid in reconstruction. Many colleagues contributed to a book of reminiscences.

Family
The main building was requisitioned to become the headquarters of the Anglican Church in Japan, and there Minoru met Bishop Kenneth Bayer from Harvard University. As Minoru had twice won the General MacArthur English Speech Contest, Bayer introduced him to St. Paul's School (Concord, New Hampshire), from where he progressed to Harvard. He later went on to become president and chair of Mitsubishi, and married Kikuko, daughter of Hisaya's son .

Notes

1942 deaths
Businesspeople in shipping
20th-century Japanese businesspeople
World War II spies for Japan
Japanese civilians killed in World War II